The Carleton Farms landfill is located in Sumpter Township of Wayne County in the U.S. state of Michigan.

From 1970s to 2002 the site was operated by Carleton Farms Incorporated as a Liquid industrial waste generator.

As of September, 2005, one million tons of waste is shipped from Toronto to the Carleton Farms Landfill annually after 2002.
This accounts for about 10% of Michigan's total waste.

The landfill is located near Crosswind Marsh Preserve, a reconstructed marsh created to replace the one formerly located at Detroit Metropolitan Wayne County Airport.

See also
Landfills in the United States
Green Lane landfill - successor site to Carleton Farms for the City of Toronto

References

External links
Trash Topography at Canadian Architect

Landfills in the United States
Environment of Michigan
Geography of Wayne County, Michigan